Karl August Engelbrekt Ahlqvist, who wrote as A. Oksanen (7 August 1826 – 20 November 1889), was a Finnish professor, poet, scholar of the Finno-Ugric languages, author, and literary critic. Today, he is best remembered as the sharpest critic of writer Aleksis Kivi, who later rose to the position of the national author of Finland.

Biography
He was born in Kuopio, Finland. He was the illegitimate child of Baron Johan Mauritz Nordenstam (1802-1882); his mother Maria Augusta Ahlqvist (1806-1886) was a servant.

He became a student at the Imperial Alexander University (now University of Helsinki) in 1844. He was a Philosophy candidate 1853, Licentiate of Law 1854 and took a Doctor of Philosophy in 1859. In 1863, he became a professor of Finnish language and literature at the University of Helsinki. He became Dean of the History-Linguistic Section 1882–1884. He served as the university's Rector from 1884 to 1887. He resigned as emeritus in 1888. He died in 1889 at  Helsinki, Finland.

In 1846 and 1847, he traveled through the eastern part of Ostrobothnia, as well as Finnish and Russian Karelia, partly gathering local folk tales and partly to investigate minorities languages. In 1854–55, he spent on research trips among the Finnish tribes in the Baltic Sea provinces, the province of Olonets and eastern Russia and Siberia. Between 1856 and 1859, he studied Finno-Ugric languages in the areas of Volga River and the Ural Mountains. In 1861 and 1862, he was in  Hungary  returning with the results of his ethnographic and linguistic observations.

As a scholar Ahlqvist contributed to reformation of the Finnish language, and was highly esteemed for his work in the Finnish, Hungarian, Estonian and related languages.  He founded the Finnish language magazine Suometar  in 1847 which was published until 1866 and later also founded the Finnish linguistic journal Kieletär which was published between 1871 and 1875. Ahlqvist was also the first to translate the works of Johan Ludvig Runeberg (1804–1877) into Finnish. As a literary critic Ahlqvist was uncompromising. His pungent criticism of Seitsemän veljestä by Aleksis Kivi (1834–1872)  caused the publishers to postpone its issue.

Works

 Satu, 1847
 Bidrag till finska. Finska språkforskningens historia, 1854
 Viron nykyisemmästä kirjallisuudesta, 1855
 Wotisk grammatik jemte språkprof och ordförteckning, 1855
 Anteckningar i Nordtschudiskan, 1859
 Muistelmia matkoilta Venäjällä vuosina 1845–58, 1859
 Läran on verben i mordwinska, 1859
 Laulu kellosta (Friedrich Schiller), 1859 (translator)
 Väkinäinen naiminen (Molière) (translator)
 Kavaluus ja rakkaus (Schiller), 1863 (translator)
 Säkeniä I-II, 1860, 1868
 Versuch einer mokscha-mordwinischen gramatik nebst texten und wörterverzeichniss, 1861
 Suomalainen runousoppi kielelliseltä kannalta, 1863
 Auszüge aus einer neuen grammatik der finnischen sprache, 1868
 Suomalainen murteiskirja, 1869
 Det vestfinska språkets kulturord, 1871
 Uusi suomalainen lukemisto suomalais-ruotsalaisen sanakirjan kanssa, 1873
 Suomen kielen rakennus, 1877
 Täydellinen Kalevalan sanasto, 1878
 Unter wogulen und ostjaken, 1883
 Elias Lönnrot, 1884
 Tutkimuksia Kalevalan tekstissä ja tämän tarkastusta, 1886
 Kalevalan karjalaisuus, 1887
 Suomalaisia puhekokeita, 1889
 Wogulischer Wörterverzeichniss, 1891
 Wogulische sprachtexte nebst entwurf einer wogulischen grammatik aus dem nacthklasse des verfassers. Hrsg. Von Yrjö Wichman, 1894
 Oksasen runoja, 1898
 Kirjeet, 1982

References

External links
 
 
 August Ahlqvist in 375 humanists 31.1.2015, Faculty of Arts, University of Helsinki

1826 births
1889 deaths
People from Kuopio
Writers from North Savo
Academic staff of the University of Helsinki
University of Helsinki alumni
Finnish male poets
Finnish Finno-Ugrists
Finnish literary critics
19th-century Finnish poets
19th-century male writers
Rectors of the University of Helsinki